Dubininkas is a village in Varėna district municipality, in Alytus County, in southeastern Lithuania. As of today village has no pernament residents.

References

Villages in Alytus County
Varėna District Municipality